Ternas is a commune in the Pas-de-Calais department in the Hauts-de-France region of France.

Geography

Population

Places of interest
 The church of St. Vaast, dating from the sixteenth century.
 A sixteenth century manor house.

See also
 Communes of the Pas-de-Calais department

References

Communes of Pas-de-Calais